Strenuous may refer to:

 The Strenuous Life, a speech by Theodore Roosevelt
 HMS Strenuous (J338), a World War II era ship
 The strenuous grade of climbing